Kilbride is a civil parish in County Westmeath, Ireland.

Kilbride is one of 10 civil parishes in the barony of Fartullagh in the Province of Leinster.

Kilbride civil parish comprises 7 townlands: Beggstown, Fearmore, Gibbonstown, Kilbride, Moorerow or Tonlegee, Simonstown, and Whitewell.

The neighbouring civil parishes are: Moylisker and Enniscoffey to the north, Pass of Kilbride to the east,
Castlelost to the south and Carrick to the west.

References

External links
Kilbride civil parish at the IreAtlas Townland Data Base
Kilbride civil parish at townlands.ie
Kilbride civil parish at the Placenames Database of Ireland

Civil parishes of County Westmeath